Tshiuetin Rail Transportation Inc.  is a rail company that owns and operates a  Canadian regional railway that stretches through the wilderness of western Labrador and northeastern Quebec. It connects Emeril, Labrador with Schefferville, Quebec on the interprovincial boundary. The company also operates a  railway that connects Sept-Îles, Quebec to Emeril. The company is the first railway in North America owned and operated by Indigenous peoples, specifically by the Innu Nation of Matimekush-Lac John, the Naskapi Nation of Kawawachikamach, and the Innu Takuaikan Uashat Mak Mani-Utenam.

History 

Tshiuetin Rail Transportation operates on the Menihek Subdivision, a rail line running from Emeril Junction to Schefferville. The Menihek Subdivision used to be part of the QNSX main line, constructed between 1951 and 1954. After mining activity in Schefferville ended with the closure of the Schefferville iron mine in 1983, QNSX shifted its priority to the Sept-Îles to Labrador City line, and the Emeril Jct to Schefferville line had limited freight and subsidized passenger service for the remaining First Nations communities in the region.

By 2006, passenger rail service was considered by the Canadian government to be the only surface transportation mode available to and from Schefferville. Preceding the purchase of the Menihek Subdivision, QNSX was actively looking to sell off the rail line, but no other pre-existing railroad companies made purchase offers. Three local First Nation councils formed a single company to buy the line from QNSX.

In 2004, Tshiuetin Rail was issued a certificate of fitness by the Canadian Transportation Agency, before the railroad acquired the Menihek Subdivision. The company took possession of the Menihek Subdivision "as is, where is". The company was to provide all passenger rail and limited freight service. The company will also provide passenger rail service on the remaining QNSX-owned line running from the port of Sept-Îles to Emeril Jct (and on to Schefferville).

Tshiuetin Rail began operations on December 1, 2005, with the conclusion of an agreement between the three owners of Tshiuetin Rail and the owners of the Quebec North Shore and Labrador Railway (QNSX), Rail Enterprises Incorporated and Iron Ore Company of Canada. Under this agreement, finalized in the fall of 2005, QNSX sold its Menihek Subdivision, for the nominal sum of $1.

The agreement between IOC and the three First Nations who own Tshiuetin Rail has resulted in the first aboriginal ownership of a railway line in Canada.

This railway (along with the QNSX line, Chemin de fer Arnaud, and Wabush Lake Railway) form an isolated railway network, as it does not have a physical connection with the North American rail network; however Compagnie de gestion de Matane operates a rail ferry service connecting to Sept-Îles.

In media 
The importance of the line is documented in Caroline Monnet's 2016 short film Tshiuetin.

On July 6, 2020, Chloë Ellingson of the New York Times published an extensive pictorial essay on the railway.

References

Further reading
"Commuting, and Confronting History, on a Remote Canadian Railway The Tshiuetin line, the first railroad in North America owned and operated by First Nations people, is a symbol of reclamation and defiance for the communities it serves."

External links 

 
 Map of the QNSX and Tshiuetin Rail Transportation lines
 Rail Lines of Northern Quebec
 Rail Lines of Labrador

Newfoundland and Labrador railways
Quebec railways
Passenger railways in Newfoundland and Labrador
Passenger railways in Quebec
Companies based in Quebec
2005 establishments in Quebec
Railway companies established in 2005
Transport in Côte-Nord
Labrador
Innu